Parvez Butt (Urdu: پرویز بٹ; b. 4 October 1942), is a Pakistani mechanical engineer and public official who served as the chairman of the Pakistan Atomic Energy Commission from 2001 till 2006.

His career is mostly spent at the Pakistan Atomic Energy Commission's nuclear power division before chairing the agency, and went to serve in the Musharraf administration as a policy adviser on science as a Federal Secretary from 2006 until 2008. He continued his public service when he joined the Gilani administration as a policy adviser on nuclear energy at the Planning Commission which he served until 2013.

Biography 

Parvez Butt was born in Gujranwala, Punjab in India on 4 October 1942 where he did his schooling and matriculation. He attended the University of Engineering and Technology (UET) in Lahore where he graduated with Bachelor of Science (BS) in mechanical engineering in 1962, and went to attend the University of Toronto in Canada to pursue higher studies in engineering in 1963.

In 1965, Butt graduated with Master of Science (MS) in nuclear engineering from the University of Toronto.

Career at Pakistan Atomic Energy Commission

In 1963, Butt found employment with the Pakistan Atomic Energy Commission (PAEC) where his career is spent in nuclear power division rather than weapons production; he was involved in design phase of the his country's first commercial nuclear power in Karachi–the CANDU-type KANUPP-I reactor. From 1965 to 1970, Butt worked in the design engineering at the GE Canada at their office in Peterborough, Ontario, where he was involved in overall design of the nuclear power plant.

From 1972 to 1976, Butt worked as principal engineer at the KANUPP-I to ensure the commercial power generation and grid operations of the nuclear power plant to supply energy to Karachi. When the GE Canada decided to eject from supporting the KANUPP program, Butt was instrumental in setting up the machine shop to engage in designing, manufacturing, and production of the mechanical spare parts needed for plant machinery.

He built up his reputation among his peers as a reputable machinist and design component engineer whose role was instrumental in setting up the mechanical workshop, machine tools manufacturing shop, and a welding facility that supported the plant operations as part of his responsibility to develop indigenous capability to ensure the grid operations of the nuclear power plant. During his employment at the Karachi Nuclear Power Plant, Butt realized the importance of the welding and nondestructive testing when he co-founded the Pakistan Welding Institute in Islamabad and the Nondestructive testing facility in Taxila.

Butt, eventually moved towards practicing mechanical engineering, when he became involved in setting up the standards for welding and machining of the fasteners and other design component parts when he was appointed director at the Atomic Energy Commission in 1984. In 1994, Butt left his plant manager position when he accepted the position as "Member Power" at the corporate offices of the PAEC to advise the Chairman of the PAEC on nuclear power and commercial energy. Butt's experience in machine design components and welding was instrumental that benefited his country to expand the nuclear power generation with the Chashma Nuclear Power Plant in Punjab. As Director-General of Nuclear Power Division at the PAEC, and later its Member of Power, Butt oversaw the design phase and construction of the Chashma Nuclear Power Plant built with the financing provided by the China.

Chairman of the PAEC

In 2001, the Musharraf administration announced to appoint Butt as the Chairman of the Pakistan Atomic Energy Commission— this appointment was significant in international media due to the fact that Butt was not involved in weapons production. In 2003–04, he helped negotiate with China over the financial funding of three more commercial nuclear power plants in Chashma district. In 2006, Butt responded to the lawsuit filed at the Supreme Court of Pakistan by the local residents of Baghalchur, a former uranium exploration mining site and testified at the Supreme Court when he stated: "It is being done in keeping with the international standards for storing nuclear waste".

His role in nuclear power generation in his country was crucial when Butt signed a contract with International Atomic Energy Agency (IAEA) on 3 September 2004,that mandated Pakistan government to extensively use nuclear energy for civilian purposes in agriculture, industrial, health, education and environment sectors.

With this agreement, Pakistan had become the "highest recipient of IAEA's financial and technical assistance" and that the relevant international agencies and Islamabad's bilateral supporters had been taken into confidence about the application of nuclear energy for civilian purposes. In 2006, Parvez Butt submitted a long-term nuclear power plant project to the federal government, which called for established more civilian nuclear power plants to increase the industrial output of the country.

On 26 March 2006, Butt seek the retirement from the chairmanship of the PAEC and accepted the position as a science adviser (local: Federal Secretary), to the Musharraf administration.

Government work and public advocacy 

On 4 July 2006, Butt sought retirement from the chairmanship of the PAEC when he rotated the chair of the PAEC to Anwar Ali, a computational physicist. He joined the federal government as a science adviser (local position: Federal Secretary) and served in the Musharraf administration until 2008. Butt was later taken as a policy adviser on nuclear energy by the Gilani administration which he served till 2013. Throughout his career, Butt was honored with his nation's award including:

Nishan-e-Imtiaz (2015)
Hilal-e-Imtiaz (1999)
Sitara-e-Imtiaz (1993)

Pervez Butt has been an active member of the Board of Government of World Association of Nuclear Operators (WANO), World Nuclear Association (WNA) and the International Atomic Energy Agency (IAEA). He was elected the Vice Chair of the IAEA Board of Governors in 2005.

Research paper
Status and Potential of Small and Medium Power Reactors in Pakistan.

Awards and honours
Hilal-i-Imtiaz (1999)
Sitara-i-Imtiaz (1999)
 Tamgha-e-Baqa (2000)
Nishan-e-Imtiaz (2016)

Associations
 Member of the World Association of Nuclear Operators (WANO)
 Member of World Nuclear Association (WNA)
 Vice Chair of the International Atomic Energy Agency (IAEA) (2005)
 An elected fellow of Pakistan Nuclear Society (1995)

See also
Nuclear power

Notes

References
 Parvez Butt
 https://web.archive.org/web/20110718005705/http://www.pakissan.com/english/news/newsDetail.php?newsid=6791
 http://www.pr-inside.com/the-state-of-pakistan-s-competitiveness-report-r128628.htm
 http://www.accessmylibrary.com/coms2/summary_0286-13522849_ITM
 https://web.archive.org/web/20101009051507/http://www.competitiveness.org.pk/BoD/pervezbutt.pdf
 https://web.archive.org/web/20090411215521/http://hec.gov.pk/insidehec/parvez_butt.html

Living people
1942 births
People from Gujranwala
University of Engineering and Technology, Lahore alumni
20th-century Pakistani engineers
Pakistani mechanical engineers
Pakistani expatriates in Canada
University of Toronto alumni
Pakistani nuclear engineers
Pakistani inventors
Pakistani nuclear physicists
International Atomic Energy Agency officials
Chairpersons of the Pakistan Atomic Energy Commission
Recipients of Sitara-i-Imtiaz
Recipients of Hilal-i-Imtiaz
Recipients of Nishan-e-Imtiaz